Diospyros arupaj is a species of flowering plant in the ebony family Ebenaceae, native to Amazonas, Brazil. A tree reaching , it is found in igapó forests.

References

arupaj
Endemic flora of Brazil
Flora of North Brazil
Plants described in 2000